Brazil is 9th on the all time medal table at the World Judo Championships. Brazil's first World Championships medal was won by Chiaki Ishii at Men's -93 kg event in 1971. He won bronze. Danielle Zangrando won the first woman's medal at Women's -56 kg event in 1995. She won bronze. João Derly won the first golden medal at Men's -66 kg event in 2005.

At the 2007 World Judo Championships, held in Rio de Janeiro, Brazil got the best placing on the medal table, finishing 2nd behind only Japan.

Medalists at the individual competitions

Source:

Medal tables

By gender

By athlete

Only athletes with at least one gold medal or three medals

Brazil at the Judo Team World Championships

* Judokas who participated in the qualifying only and received medals.

* Judokas who participated in the qualifying only and received medals.

Medal table

References

World Championships
World Judo Championships